Enver Adrović (born 20 May 1969) is a retired Montenegrin footballer from SFR Yugoslavia.

Life and career
Born in Ivangrad, SFR Yugoslavia (now known as Berane) he played in the Slovenian PrvaLiga with NK Ljubljana and Olimpija Ljubljana and in Austrian Bundesliga with SK Vorwärts Steyr.

References

1969 births
Living people
People from Berane
Association football midfielders
Yugoslav footballers
Montenegrin footballers
Serbia and Montenegro footballers
NK Ljubljana players
NK Olimpija Ljubljana (1945–2005) players
SK Vorwärts Steyr players
Slovenian PrvaLiga players
2. Liga (Austria) players
Serbia and Montenegro expatriate footballers
Expatriate footballers in Slovenia
Serbia and Montenegro expatriate sportspeople in Slovenia
Expatriate footballers in Austria
Serbia and Montenegro expatriate sportspeople in Austria